A Good Year is a 2006 romantic comedy film directed and produced by Ridley Scott. The film stars Russell Crowe, Marion Cotillard, Didier Bourdon, Abbie Cornish, Tom Hollander, Freddie Highmore and Albert Finney. The film is loosely based on the 2004 novel of the same name by British author Peter Mayle. The film was theatrically released on 9 September 2006 by 20th Century Fox. The film grossed over $42.2 million against its $35 million budget. The film received nominations for the Critics Choice Award for Best Young Actor and the Satellite Award for Best Cinematography. A Good Year was released on DVD on 27 February 2007 by 20th Century Fox Home Entertainment.

Plot

Young Max Skinner, whose parents died in an accident, spends his childhood summer holidays learning to appreciate the finer things at his Uncle Henry's vineyard estate in Provence in southeastern France. Twenty-five years later, Max is a successful but arrogant workaholic trader in London with a cheeky-chappy persona.

Following his uncle's death, Max is the sole beneficiary of the French property. He travels to Provence to prepare a quick sale. Shortly after arriving, by driving while fumbling with a cell phone, he unknowingly causes a local café owner, Fanny Chenal, to crash her bicycle. Subsequently, he discovers that his latest City financial stunt has caused real trouble for the owners of the trading company he works for, and he is ordered to return to London as soon as possible.

To assist in his planned sale of the property, Max hurriedly snaps some photos and in the process falls into an empty swimming pool. He is unable to escape until Fanny, driving by and spotting his rental car, turns on the water supply in retaliation. This delay causes Max to miss his flight and, having failed to report to the directors in person, he is suspended from work and trading activities for one week.

On Henry's estate, Max must deal with a gruff, dedicated winemaker, Francis Duflot, who fears being separated from his precious vines. Duflot pays a vineyard inspector to tell Max that the soil is bad and the vines worthless.

They are surprised by the arrival of young Napa Valley oenophile Christie Roberts, who is backpacking through Europe and claims to be Henry's previously unknown illegitimate daughter. Max realizes, but does not tell her, that French law decrees that even though she is not his uncle's legitimate daughter, she still becomes the rightful heir to the Chateau and vineyards. 

As Max did earlier, Christie finds the house wine unpalatable but is impressed by Max's casual offering of the boutique Le Coin Perdu ("the lost corner") vintage, noting some intriguing characteristics. During dinner at the Duflot house, while slightly inebriated, Max exposes his concern that she might lay claim to the estate and brusquely interrogates her.

Max's assistant Gemma warns him of the ambitious antics of other employees. To ensure he is not usurped by Kenny, his second-in-command in London, through whom Max continues to direct trades, he intentionally gives the ambitious young trader bad advice, getting him fired.

Max becomes enamoured with Fanny, who is rumoured to have sworn off men. He successfully woos her into his bed. She leaves him the next morning, expecting him to return to his life in London. A disillusioned Christie also decides to move on. Max finds his uncle's memoirs, which contain proof of her heritage. 

Max bids her farewell while handing her an unexplained note inside a book she was reading. While informing Duflot of the pending estate sale, Max learns that the mysterious expensive Le Coin Perdu was made by Henry and Duflot with "illegal vines" from the estate, bypassing wine classification and appellation laws.

The estate is sold and Max returns to London where Sir Nigel, the company chairman, offers him a choice: either a large discharge settlement, or the partnership in the trading firm. Max asks about Nigel's art in the conference room, van Gogh's "Road with Cypress and Star", which Fanny has a copy of in her restaurant. Upon Nigel's dismissive comment that the real one is kept in a vault and the $200,000 copy in the office is for show, Max reconsiders if he wants to still be like Nigel.

Max invalidates the estate's sale with the farewell letter he gave to Christie, which he forged, along with real photos confirming Christie as Henry's daughter with a valid claim to the entire estate. (As a child Max signed checks for his uncle, and is able to replicate his handwriting.)

He puts his London residence up for sale and returns to Provence, entering into a relationship with Fanny, both of them remembering their connection as kids. Christie also returns and she and Francis jointly run the vineyard while trying to reconcile their vastly different philosophies of wine production. This enables Max to focus his entire attention on Fanny.

Cast

Production

Development and writing

Ridley Scott had owned a house in Provence for fifteen years, and wanted to film a production there. Scott Free president Lisa Ellzey recommended the works of author Peter Mayle, who had written best-selling books set in the south of France. Scott and Mayle were acquaintances and neighbours, having worked together in advertising and commercials during the 1970s, but as the author did not want to write a screenplay, he instead wrote a new book after discussing a film plot with Scott. “Ridley arrived with a newspaper clipping which reported on new wines in Bordeaux – ‘garage’ wines – which commanded huge prices without a chateau or pedigree. Yet, people paid a fortune for them”,Mayle said. “I saw this piece in the newspaper business section of the Times about a vineyard in France that was selling garage wine for over £30,000 a case,” Scott recounted about the 1996 clipping, which he still keeps in his files in London. “I was looking for an excuse to come back to France to shoot a film, and this story idea offered the perfect opportunity. I bounced this idea off Peter Mayle and he said, ‘That would make a good novel’. “And I said, ‘You write the book, then I’ll get the film rights.’ So, he wrote the book.” Screenwriter Marc Klein was brought in after Scott read an adaptation he did of The Girls' Guide to Hunting and Fishing – eventually released in 2007 as Suburban Girl.

Klein had to expand and alter the story of the book to make the adaptation "more movie-like". A particular focus was to add conflict, with changes such as turning Fanny from a gentle character to a stubborn woman who starts without sympathy for Max. Another addition was the scene where Max falls in the swimming pool, which Scott said was to demonstrate "[that] the house had not let him go". The director wanted to portray Uncle Henry on screen instead of just describing him. While writer Marc Klein first suggested depicting him as a ghost, Scott's attempts at that did not work so he used flashbacks which "occur just as another scene" where it would depict "the grooming of Max as child which will be used as payoffs for the three acts that follow".

Casting
Klein described Henry as "sounding like Albert Finney" so Scott hired the actor, with whom he had worked in The Duellists. Scott brought Russell Crowe as the protagonist Max. The actor stated that it was a good opportunity for them to reunite after 2000's Gladiator as "it just seemed more fun to go into this smaller place, where the problems weren't as vast." The character was considered a change from Crowe's usual roles, with some noting it may reflect "maturity" or "contentment", with Australia's Courier-Mail dubbing him "A Mellow Fellow". Crowe said of his life at the time: "[I'm] relaxed ... Work isn't the most important thing in my life now. It's not even in the top ten." The actor also stressed the importance of his family. Scott also stated one of the reasons for the project was that he had "not done much in the way of comedy" and it seemed to be a good opportunity to "keep challenging yourself".

Abbie Cornish did a videotaped audition for Ridley Scott only weeks before filming started. Eva Green and Vahina Giocante auditioned for the role of Fanny Chenal, which later went to Marion Cotillard.

Filming
The film was shot throughout nine weeks in 2005, mostly in locations Scott described as "eight minutes from my house". French locations were filmed at Bonnieux, Cucuron and Gordes in Vaucluse, Marseille Provence Airport, and the rail station in Avignon. London locations included Albion Riverside in Battersea, Broadgate, the Bluebird Cafe on King's Road in Chelsea, and Criterion Restaurant in Piccadilly Circus. The scene with the tennis match between Max and Duflot was added on the set, replacing an argument at the vines to provide "a battle scene". As the swimming pool on Chateau La Canorgue in Bonnieux did not fit the one Scott had envisioned from the scene, only the scenes outside the pool were filmed there. The one after Max had fallen was dug and concreted nearby, and the original one had its bottom replaced digitally to match. The production team could not film the wine cave from La Canorgue as they shot during the period where it was being used, so the wine cellar from a nearby hotel was turned into a cave. While southern France does not have clay courts as the weather makes them hard to maintain, Scott wanted one for its dirty and beaten up aspect, so the tennis court was built from scratch, including posts straight from the Wimbledon courts. Fanny's cafe was shot in a Gordes restaurant, with designer Sonja Klaus decorating it with items bought from second-hand shops considering the character would have done the same. Klaus employed a kitsch decoration on Duflot's estate to show it was "a character keeping up with the Joneses – if it was in America, he would drive a golden Cadillac with leopard skin print seats", and decorated the large water basin of Cucuron with floating candles to "make it look like a fabulous event" for Max's dinner with Fanny.

Music
Marc Streitenfeld worked as a music editor on Hans Zimmer's Remote Control Productions and was invited by Scott to make his debut as a film score composer. The soundtrack includes "Moi Lolita" by Alizée, "Breezin' Along with the Breeze" by Josephine Baker, "Gotta Get Up", "Jump into the Fire", and "How Can I Be Sure of You" by Harry Nilsson, "Hey Joe" by Johnny Hallyday, "Vous, qui passez sans me voir" and "J'attendrai" by Jean Sablon, "Le chant du gardien" by Tino Rossi, "Je chante" by Charles Trenet, "Old Cape Cod" by Patti Page, "Walk Right Back" by the Everly Brothers, "Boum!" by Adrien Chevalier, and "Itsy Bitsy Petit Bikini" by Richard Anthony. The CD includes only 15 songs from the film; several are left out.

Release

Theatrical release
A Good Year was theatrically released in the United Kingdom on 27 October 2006 and in the United States on 10 November 2006 by 20th Century Fox.

Home media
A Good Year was released on DVD on 27 February 2007 by 20th Century Fox Home Entertainment.

Reception

Box office
The film grossed $7,459,300 in the United States and a total of $42,269,923 worldwide.

As of 2022, it has earned over $10 million in DVD sales in the United States.

Critical response
On Rotten Tomatoes, the film has an approval rating of 25% based on reviews from 134 critics, with an average rating of 4.80/10. The site's critical consensus reads, "A Good Year is a fine example of a top-notch director and actor out of their elements, in a sappy romantic comedy lacking in charm and humor." On Metacritic it has a score of 47% based on reviews from 33 critics, indicating "mixed or average reviews".

In Variety, Todd McCarthy wrote that the film is a "divertissement" that is easy to watch, but "doesn't amount to much". Stephen Holden of The New York Times called it "a three-P movie: pleasant, pretty and predictable. One might add piddling". Writing for the Los Angeles Times, Kenneth Turan said, "the fact that we know exactly what will happen [...] is not what's wrong with A Good Year. After all, we go to films like this precisely because the satisfaction of emotional certainty is what we're looking for. What we're not looking for is a romantic comedy made by individuals with no special feeling for the genre who stretch a half-hour's worth of story to nearly two hours". Comparing it to Under the Tuscan Sun, Love Actually, and Roman Holiday, Jessica Reaves of the Chicago Tribune said The Good Year was "unbearably sweet and emotionally lifeless". British film critic Peter Bradshaw wrote in The Guardian that it was "a humourless cinematic slice of tourist gastro-porn".

In a book-length study of Ridley Scott's film career, Adam Barkman summarized the general critical response to A Good Year as "lightweight as far as most critics were concerned" and that it "offer[ed] little in comparison to the combined commercial and critical success of the next venture, [American Gangster], the biopic of Harlem drug lord Frank Lucas".

Accolades

References

External links

 
 
 
 Filming locations in Provence 
 Filming locations with real photos

2006 films
2006 romantic comedy-drama films
20th Century Fox films
American romantic comedy-drama films
British romantic comedy-drama films
Films about wine
Films based on British novels
Films based on romance novels
Films directed by Ridley Scott
Films scored by Marc Streitenfeld
Films set in France
Films set in London
Films shot in France
Films shot in London
2000s French-language films
Peter Mayle
Scott Free Productions films
Trading films
2006 comedy films
2006 drama films
2000s English-language films
2000s American films
2000s British films